The Summit may refer to:

Structures 

 The Summit (Wheatfield, New York), shopping center
 The Summit (Birmingham, Alabama), shopping center
 The Summit of Louisville, the original name of a Kentucky shopping center now known as the Paddock Shops
 The Summit (Reno, Nevada), shopping center
 The Summit (San Francisco), condominium
 The Summit (Hong Kong)  
 The Summit (Houston), Texas, an indoor arena now known as the Lakewood Church Central Campus
 The Summit, observation deck in One Vanderbilt, New York City

Film and television
 The Summit (2012 film), a film about the mountain K2 by Nick Ryan
 The Summit (2017 film), an Argentine film
 The Summit (TV miniseries), 2008 Canadian two-part miniseries
"The Summit" (The Americans), an episode of The Americans

Other uses
 The Summit, Queensland, a town in Australia
 The Summit Media Group, a former television syndication company
 The Summit (Easthampton), weekly newspaper in Easthampton, Massachusetts, published by the Daily Hampshire Gazette
 Altamont, California, formerly The Summit
 Summit League, NCAA Division I athletics conference (aka The Summit)
 The Summit Bechtel Family National Scout Reserve, a Boy Scouts of America reservation
 WAPS (FM), branded 91.3 The Summit, a non-commercial radio station in Akron, Ohio

See also
 Summit (disambiguation)
 "The Summitt", the name given to the basketball court at Thompson–Boling Arena in honor of longtime coach Pat Summitt